Tomterna is a populated place in Bollnäs Municipality, Gävleborg County, Sweden.

References 

Populated places in Bollnäs Municipality